Drebbel may refer to:

Cornelis Drebbel (1572–1633), Dutch scientist and inventor of the first navigable submarine
Drebbel (crater), a lunar impact crater